The Sun Doctor was the second novel written in 1961 by author and actor Robert Shaw. It centers on Benjamin Halliday, a British doctor working in Africa who is returning to England to receive a knighthood. However, he is tormented with feelings of remorse and guilt concerning the afflicted African tribe he was attending. He is also haunted by the early death of his father. The story is told mostly in flashback. It is based on Shaw's play Strange Providence. It won the 1962 Hawthornden Prize.

References

1961 British novels
Chatto & Windus books
Hawthornden Prize-winning works